Eicochrysops rogersi, the Rogers' blue, is a butterfly in the family Lycaenidae. It is found in central and southern Kenya and possibly Tanzania. The habitat consists of savanna.

References

Butterflies described in 1924
Eicochrysops